Irish Music is a monthly music magazine covering folk and traditional Irish music.

References

External links
 Irish Music official website

Music magazines published in Ireland
Magazines established in 1974
Monthly magazines published in Ireland